Oriented projective geometry is an oriented version of real projective geometry.

Whereas the real projective plane describes the set of all unoriented lines through the origin in R3, the oriented projective plane describes lines with a given orientation. There are applications in computer graphics and computer vision where it is necessary to distinguish between rays light being emitted or absorbed by a point.

Elements in an oriented projective space are defined using signed homogeneous coordinates. Let  be the set of elements of  excluding the origin.
Oriented projective line, : , with the equivalence relation  for  all .

An alternative way to view the spaces is as points on the circle or sphere, given by the points (x,y,w) with

x2+y2+w2=1.

Oriented real projective space
Let n be a nonnegative integer. The (analytical model of, or canonical) oriented (real) projective space or (canonical) two-sided projective space  is defined as

Here, we use  to stand for two-sided.

Alternative models

The straight model

The spherical model

Distance in oriented real projective space

Oriented complex projective geometry

Let n be a nonnegative integer. The oriented complex projective space  is defined as
. Here, we write  to stand for the 1-sphere.

See also
 Variational analysis

Notes

References
 Nice introduction to oriented projective geometry in chapters 14 and 15. More at author's website. Sherif Ghali.
 
 
 A. G. Oliveira, P. J. de Rezende, F. P. SelmiDei An Extension of CGAL to the Oriented Projective Plane T2 and its Dynamic Visualization System, 21st Annual ACM Symp. on Computational Geometry, Pisa, Italy, 2005.

Projective geometry